Tang dynasty (618–690, 705–907) was an imperial dynasty of China.

Tang dynasty may also refer to:
Tang Dynasty (band), a Chinese rock band founded in 1988
Tang Dynasty (album), their 1992 debut album
Later Tang (923–937), a northern state during imperial China's Five Dynasties and Ten Kingdoms period
Southern Tang (937–975), a southern state during imperial China's Five Dynasties and Ten Kingdoms period

See also
New Tang Dynasty Television, a television broadcaster based in New York City since 2001
Tang (disambiguation)